National Highway 144A is a national highway in the union territory of Jammu and Kashmir in India. NH-144A is a spur road of National Highway 44 that runs between Jammu and Poonch.

Route 
Jammu, Akhnoor,  Sunderbani,Nowshera, Rajouri, Poonch.

Junctions 

  Terminal near Jammu.
  at Bhambla.

See also 

 List of National Highways in India
 List of National Highways in India by state

References

External links 

 NH 144A on OpenStreetMap

National highways in India
National Highways in Jammu and Kashmir
Transport in Jammu
Transport in Poonch